Planet of Ice is the third full-length album from Minus the Bear, released in the UK on August 20, 2007 and in the US on August 21 by Suicide Squeeze Records. It was produced and recorded by the band's former keyboard player, Matt Bayles, in February and March 2007. It is the first Minus the Bear album to feature keyboardist Alex Rose, who replaced Matt Bayles after he left the band to concentrate on his career as a producer. It is also their last album on Suicide Squeeze Records until 2017's Voids.

Track listing

Bonus CD
The first edition contained a Bonus CD with four tracks, two of which did not appear on Planet of Ice.

Vinyl information
A limited run of 2000 colored records was pressed and released by Suburban Home on vinyl imprint, Vinyl Collective. High demand led to a second pressing, which included a limited edition tour pressing.

To date, there have been four official pressings of Planet of Ice on vinyl.  All pressings are double LPs.

Test pressing
A test pressing of 20 copies was pressed by Suburban Home records. Copies were given to the band members, recording engineers, and management. Unique artwork was hand painted on each sleeve by Vinnie Fasano.

First pressing
 2000 copies total, sold out prior to US release date.
 500 - clear with magenta splatter
 500 - clear with silver splatter
 500 - white with silver splatter
 500 - solid silver

Second pressing
 1000 copies total, shipping early October 2007. Has since sold out.
 500 - clear with gold splatter (tour exclusive)
 500 - solid white

Third pressing
 1000 copies total, made available in 2008 after second pressing sold out.
 500 - coke bottle blue
 500 - baby pink

Fourth pressing
 1000 copies total, made available in 2010 after third pressing.
 500 - clear granite
 500 - clear with purple splash

Personnel
 Jake Snider - vocals, guitar
 Dave Knudson - guitar
 Erin Tate - drums, percussion
 Cory Murchy - bass
 Alex Rose - keyboards, saxophone, vocals

Other personnel
 Co-produced by Chris Common
 Engineered by Matt Bayles and Chris Common
 Additional engineering by Alex Rose and Jake Snider
 Mixed by Matt Bayles
 Mastered by Ed Brooks
 Cover Art by Ryan Blinsky

References

External links
SuicideSqueeze.net

2007 albums
Minus the Bear albums
Suicide Squeeze Records albums
Albums produced by Matt Bayles
Albums recorded at Robert Lang Studios